During the Second Sino-Japanese War, Wang Jingwei, former Premier of the Republic of China and Vice Director-General of the Kuomintang (Chinese Nationalist Party), split from the party in 1939 and established a new Kuomintang in Nanking. Wang, who collaborated with the Japanese, intended to distance the new party from the Kuomintang led by Chiang Kai-shek in Chungking. It was the sole-ruling party of Wang Jingwei regime, a puppet state of the Empire of Japan.

Officially still "Kuomintang", it was also referred to as the "Wang's Pseudo-Kuomintang" or "Wang's Puppet Kuomintang".

Establishment

From 28 to 30 August 1939, Wang Jingwei secretly convened the 6th National Congress of the KMT in the city of Shanghai. Wang appointed himself and served as the temporary chairman of the conference and gave a political report on the situation of the country regarding the Second Sino-Japanese War. The General Assembly then passed the "Resolution on Reorganizing Party Affairs" and two temporary motions, determined that all resolutions and orders of the Kuomintang under Chiang in Chongqing were completely invalid, and soon elected Wang Jingwei as the chairman of the Central Executive Committee. In accordance with the purpose of "Peaceful Anti-communist Nation Building," the congress then passed the "Revision of the Chinese Kuomintang Political Platform", declared a "Decision to Anti-Communist Basic National Policy", and issued fundamental adjustments to resume Sino-Japanese diplomatic relations.

On 30 March 1940, Wang Jingwei attended the "National Government Capital Returning Ceremony" and established a puppet government in Nanjing. The state was named, "the Reorganized National Government of the Republic of China". Wang served as the President of the Executive Yuan and Chairman of the National Government. He issued the "Ten Political Platforms for Peaceful Nation Building" which, by this time, the Kuomintang was the only legal sole-ruling party in the regime. it ruled the country directly under Wang Jingwei, essentially a one-party dictatorship. and nominally participated in the management of the North China Political Affairs Committee and the Mengjiang United Autonomous Government.

Leadership

At the beginning of its establishment, Wang's Kuomintang still recognized Lin Sen, who was appointed by Chiang Kai-shek in Chongqing as the chairman of the National Government. However, Wang Jingwei appointed himself as the "acting chairman", concurrently serving as the chief executive and chairman of the Standing Committee of the Central Executive Committee.

On 10 November 1944, Wang Jingwei died in Nagoya. On 12 November, the Nanjing "Central Political Committee" held an emergency meeting and decided that Chen Gongbo would be the president of the executive committee, acting chairman of the National Government, and chairman of the military committee. Chen officially took office on 20 November. When he took office, Chen Gongbo stated that he would adhere to the policy set by Wang Jingwei and would not waver no matter how the war progresses or how urgent the current situation is. Following Chen Gongbo, Zhou Fohai became the mayor of Shanghai in January 1945.

Dissolution
After Japan surrendered on 15 August 1945, Chen Gongbo and Zhou Fohai convened an interim meeting of the Central Political Committee in Nanjing at 4 p.m. on 16 August, announcing the abolition of the Reorganized National Government and all of its institutions, including the party.

References 

Kuomintang
Wang Jingwei regime
Kuomintang